The 2001–02 Club Atlético Boca Juniors season was the 72nd consecutive Primera División season played by the senior squad.

Summary
During summer several players left the club included right back defender  Hugo Ibarra, Colombian full back Jorge Bermudez and  midfielder Anibal Matellan. Also, Colombian Goalkeeper Oscar Cordoba almost was signed by Tottenham Hotspur prompting Mauricio Macri to block the transfer, however,  Cordoba got the transfer out during January towards Serie A team Perugia .

Macri reinforced the squad with central defender Rolando Schiavi from Argentinos Juniors, right back defender Jorge Daniel Martinez, Brazilian defender Jorginho Paulista on loan from Udinese Calcio and purely for Japanese football supporters Naohiro Takahara. With the exception of Schiavi the arrivals were a total failure and most of them were transferred out during December.

In the Apertura Tournament the team finished on 3rd spot, eleven points below of Champions Racing. Meanwhile, in 2001 Intercontinental Cup the squad was defeated by German side Bayern München after extra time.

Head coach Carlos Bianchi started negotiations for a renewal after two years of contract (the last renovation was in December 1999) and after several rumors Bianchi chose to not accept the Board conditions. Then, Macri appointed during December Uruguayan coach Oscar Tabarez former manager of Boca Juniors during 1992 Apertura Tournament which the team won and ended eleven years of League drought.

Owing to government economic measures known as Corralito in the Clausura Tournament, Macri reinforced the team with a few players included forward Héctor Bracamonte, defender Diego Crosa and Jonathan Fabbro the squad finished on 3rd spot again, eight points below of Champions River Plate.

Meanwhile, in 2002 Copa Libertadores the squad reached the quarterfinals stage and was eliminated by future Champions Paraguayan side Olimpia after a 0–1 defeat in the second leg of the series.

The season is best remembered by League debut of future club legend forward 16-yr-old Carlos Tevez against Talleres de Cordoba on 21 October 2000 .

Squad

Transfers

January

Competitions

Torneo Apertura

League table

Position by round

Matches

Torneo Clausura

League table

Position by round

Matches

Copa Mercosur

Copa Libertadores

Group stage

Eighthfinals

Quarterfinals

Intercontinental Cup

FIFA Club World Championship

As winners of the 2000 Copa Libertadores, Boca Juniors was one of the 12 teams that were invited to the 2001 FIFA Club World Championship, which would be hosted in Spain from 28 July to 12 August 2001. However, the tournament was canceled, primarily due to the collapse of ISL, which was a marketing partner of FIFA at the time.

Statistics

Players statistics

References

External links
 Club Atlético Boca Juniors official web site 

Boc
Club Atlético Boca Juniors seasons